auto_ptr is a class template that was available in previous versions of the C++ standard library (declared in the <memory> header file), which provides some basic RAII features for C++ raw pointers. It has been replaced by the unique_ptr class. 

The auto_ptr template class describes an object that stores a pointer to a single allocated object that ensures that the object to which it points gets destroyed automatically when control leaves a scope.

The C++11 standard made auto_ptr deprecated, replacing it with the unique_ptr class template. auto_ptr was fully removed in C++17.
For shared ownership, the shared_ptr template class can be used. shared_ptr was defined in C++11 and is also available in the Boost library for use with previous C++ versions.

Declaration

The auto_ptr class is declared in ISO/IEC 14882, section 20.4.5 as:
namespace std {

    template <class Y> struct auto_ptr_ref {};

    template <class X>
    class auto_ptr {
    public:
        typedef X element_type;

        // 20.4.5.1 construct/copy/destroy:
        explicit           auto_ptr(X* p =0) throw();
                           auto_ptr(auto_ptr&) throw();
        template <class Y> auto_ptr(auto_ptr<Y>&) throw();

        auto_ptr&                      operator=(auto_ptr&) throw();
        template <class Y> auto_ptr&   operator=(auto_ptr<Y>&) throw();
        auto_ptr&                      operator=(auto_ptr_ref<X>) throw();

        ~auto_ptr() throw();

        // 20.4.5.2 members:
        X&     operator*() const throw();
        X*     operator->() const throw();
        X*     get() const throw();
        X*     release() throw();
        void   reset(X* p =0) throw();

        // 20.4.5.3 conversions:
                                    auto_ptr(auto_ptr_ref<X>) throw();
        template <class Y> operator auto_ptr_ref<Y>() throw();
        template <class Y> operator auto_ptr<Y>() throw();
    };

}

Semantics

The auto_ptr has semantics of strict ownership, meaning that the auto_ptr instance is the sole entity responsible for the object's lifetime. If an auto_ptr is copied, the source loses the reference. For example:
#include <iostream>
#include <memory>
using namespace std;
 
int main(int argc, char **argv)
{
    int *i = new int;
    auto_ptr<int> x(i);
    auto_ptr<int> y;
    
    y = x;
    
    cout << x.get() << endl; // Print NULL
    cout << y.get() << endl; // Print non-NULL address i

    return 0;
}

This code will print a NULL address for the first auto_ptr object and some non-NULL address for the second, showing that the source object lost the reference during the assignment (=). The raw pointer i in the example should not be deleted, as it will be deleted by the auto_ptr that owns the reference.  In fact, new int could be passed directly into x, eliminating the need for i.

Notice that the object pointed by an auto_ptr is destroyed using operator delete; this means that you should only use auto_ptr for pointers obtained with operator new. This excludes pointers returned by malloc/calloc/realloc, and pointers to arrays (because arrays are allocated by operator new[] and must be deallocated by operator delete[]).

Because of its copy semantics, auto_ptr may not be used in STL containers that may perform element copies in their operations.

See also
 Smart pointer
 Generic programming

References

External links

 Using auto_ptr effectively
 Avoiding Memory Leaks with auto_ptr
 Article "Using the auto_ptr Class Template to Facilitate Dynamic Memory Management" by Danny Kalev
 Article "Container of auto_ptr" by Zeeshan Amjad
 Article "Update on auto_ptr" by Scott Meyers
 auto_ptr Class Template Reference from GNU libstdc++
 auto_ptr reference from Rogue Wave

Articles with example C++ code
Articles with underscores in the title
C++ Standard Library